The Organized Mind: Thinking Straight in the Age of Information Overload is a bestselling popular science book written by the McGill University neuroscientist Daniel J. Levitin, PhD, and first published by Dutton Penguin in the United States and Canada in 2014. It is Levitin's 3rd consecutive best-seller, debuting at #2 on the New York Times Best Seller List, #1 on the Canadian best-seller lists, #1 on Amazon, and #5 on The London Times bestseller list.

In The Organized Mind, Levitin demonstrates how the Information Age is drowning us with an unprecedented deluge of data, and uses the latest brain science to explain how the brain can organize this flood of information. Levitin then demonstrates methods that readers can use to regain a sense of mastery over the way they organize their homes, workplaces, and time. It answers three fundamental questions: Why does the brain pay attention to some things and not others? Why do we remember some things and not others? And how can we use that knowledge to better organize our home and workplaces, our time, social world, and decision making? 

The book is divided in three parts. The first part focuses on attention. Levitin explains why attention is the most essential mental resource for any organism and describes how the brain's attentional system works: it determines which aspects of the environment an individual will deal with, and what gets passed through to that individual's conscious awareness. The attentional awareness system is the reason one can safely drive or walk to work without noticing most of the buildings or cars one passes by.

Additionally, Levitin reveals that the phrase "paying attention" is scientifically true. Multitasking comes at an actual metabolic cost: switching back and forth between tasks burns a lot more oxygenated glucose (the fuel the brain runs on) than focusing on one task does, and can lead quickly to mental exhaustion.

The second and third parts of the book show how readers can use their attentional and memory systems for better organization, from the classroom to the boardroom, from home lives to interactions with friends, doctors, and business associates.
  
On publication, the book received praise from a wide array of people including former U.S. Secretary of State (and Secretary of the Treasury) George P. Shultz; Gen. Stanley A. McChrystal (ret.), Nobel Prize–winning neuroscientist Stanley Prusiner, and head writer for The Big Bang Theory, Eric Kaplan.

References

External links
The distracted mind - All In The Mind - ABC Radio National (Australian Broadcasting Corporation) (Sunday, August 30, 2015)

2014 non-fiction books
Books about cognition
Cognitive science literature
Management books
Neuroscience books
Popular science books
Dutton Penguin books
Books about creativity